Our America is a film based on the book Our America: Life And Death on the South Side of Chicago.

It premiered at the 2002 Sundance Film Festival, and aired on American television later that year.

Cast
 Josh Charles as Dave Isay  
 Brandon Hammond as Lloyd "Boo" Newman  
 Serena Lee as Janelle Jones  
 Roderick Pannell as LeAlan Jones  
 Irma P. Hall as June Jones  
 Peter Paige as Gary Covino  
 Vanessa Williams as Sandra Williams
 Mykelti Williamson as Graham Ellis  
 Rukiya Bernard as Sophie Newman  
 Mark Taylor as Duane
 K. C. Collins as James  
 Neil Crone as Paxton Wade  
 Jordan Duncan as Eric Morris  
 Jordan Francis as Derrick Morris  
 Maxine Guess as Mrs. Shaw  
 Gene Mack as Stick Newman
 Daniel Anthony Farris as Elvin

Award
Daytime Emmy Awards
 2003 – Outstanding Single Camera Photography (Film or Electronic) (won)

References

External links

2002 television films
2002 films
Films based on non-fiction books
Films directed by Ernest Dickerson
2002 drama films
Hood films
American drama television films
2000s American films